Colin Dingwall is a British biochemist and cell biologist. He is a Fellow of the Royal Society of Biology and a Life Member of Clare Hall, Cambridge UK. Working with Ron Laskey  and Sir John Gurdon he established the identified the bipartite nuclear localization sequence which is the major signal for protein entry into the nucleus.

Education

Research 

Working with Ron Laskey  and Sir John Gurdon on the basic molecular mechanisms by which proteins are specifically imported into the nucleus,  he identified the bipartite nuclear localization sequence which is the major signal for protein entry into the nucleus. Using the oocyte nuclear protein nucleoplasmin, he provided the first demonstration that nuclear protein uptake is mediated by a specific polypeptide domain (11). This work identified a selective entry mechanism which implied the existence of a signal sequence within the protein specifying entry and cellular mechanisms for signal recognition and the physical movement of the protein through the nuclear pore complex.

He subsequently establish that nuclear protein accumulation occurs in two major steps, an energy dependent binding of the nuclear protein to the nuclear membrane/nuclear pore complex and a subsequent energy dependent translocation of the protein through the nuclear pore complex (12). Similar results were described by another research group (13).

The first signal shown to be both necessary and sufficient to target proteins to the nucleus was identified in SV40 Large T antigen (14, 15, 16). However, this seven amino acid sequence (PKKKRKV) did not serve as a useful identifier of functional nuclear localization sequences in other proteins. Detailed mapping of the sequence in nucleoplasmin revealed a longer sequence motif within which two domains of basic amino acids are separated by a spacer of ten other amino acids (17). Detailed analysis of the bipartite nuclear localization sequence in nucleoplasmin revealed novel characteristics including the fact that the spacer length could be increased but not decreased without loss of function and that potential phosphorylation sites within the linker region have the potential to regulate signal function (17). Many  nuclear localization sequences showing these characteristics have since been identified  the bipartite nuclear localization sequence has emerged as the major nuclear localization sequence in cellular proteins and the sequence motif is the most successful identifier of functional nuclear localization sequences in proteins (18). He suggested a model for the possible functional interaction of the basic domains of the bipartite nuclear localization sequence with sites a putative receptor (19). The broad outline of this model was confirmed ten years later by the crystallographic analysis of importin alpha complexed with a bipartite nuclear localization sequence peptide (20,21).

He has held senior positions in the pharmaceutical industry and in academia and made significant contributions to research in gene regulation in HIV and in Alzheimer's disease (22,23).

Most cited papers
Dingwall C, Laskey RA. Nuclear targeting sequences—a consensus?. Trends in biochemical sciences. 1991 Jan 1;16:478-81.  According to Google Scholar, this paper has been cited   2252 times Accessed April 15, 2021
	Robbins J, Dilwortht SM, Laskey RA, Dingwall C. Two interdependent basic domains in nucleoplasmin nuclear targeting sequence: identification of a class of bipartite nuclear targeting sequence. Cell. 1991 Feb 8;64(3):615-23.  According to Google Scholar, this paper has been cited 1690 times.
Hussain I, Powell D, Howlett DR, Tew DG, Meek TD, Chapman C, Gloger IS, Murphy KE, Southan CD, Ryan DM, Smith TS. Identification of a novel aspartic protease (Asp 2) as β-secretase. Molecular and Cellular Neuroscience. 1999 Dec 1;14(6):419-27. According to Google Scholar, this paper has been cited 1413 times.
Martins LM, Iaccarino I, Tenev T, Gschmeissner S, Totty NF, Lemoine NR, Savopoulos J, Gray CW, Creasy CL, Dingwall C, Downward J. The serine protease Omi/HtrA2 regulates apoptosis by binding XIAP through a reaper-like motif. Journal of Biological Chemistry. 2002 Jan 4;277(1):439-44.. According to Google Scholar, this paper has been cited 671 times.

References

1.	https://scholar.google.co.uk/scholar?hl=en&as_sdt=0%2C5&q=dingwall+colin&oq=dingwall

7.	Bonner WM. Protein migration into nuclei. I. Frog oocyte nuclei in vivo accumulate microinjected histones, allow entry to small proteins, and exclude large proteins. J Cell Biol. 1975 Feb;64(2):421-30. PMID 46868

8.	Bonner WM. Protein migration into nuclei. II. Frog oocyte nuclei accumulate a class of microinjected oocyte nuclear proteins and exclude a class of microinjected oocyte cytoplasmic proteins. J Cell Biol. 1975 Feb;64(2):431-7. PMID 1117031

9.	Bonner W. M. (1978) Protein migration and accumulation in nuclei in The Cell Nucleus 6, H. Busch. Ed (New York, Academic Press) part c. pp. 97–148

11.	Dingwall, C; Sharnick, SV; Laskey, RA (September 1982). "A polypeptide domain that specifies migration of nucleoplasmin into the nucleus". Cell. 30 (2): 449–458. doi:10.1016/0092-8674(82)90242-2. .

12.	Richardson, W. D., Mills, A. D., Dilworth, S. M., Laskey, R. A.., Dingwall, C. (1988) Nuclear protein migration involves two steps: Rapid binding at the nuclear envelope followed by slower translocation through nuclear pores. Cell 52:655-664.

13.	Newmeyer DD, Forbes DJ (March 1988). "Nuclear import can be separated into distinct steps in vitro: nuclear pore binding and translocation". Cell. 52 (5): 641–53. doi:10.1016/0092-8674(88)90402-3. .

15.	Kalderon D, Roberts BL, Richardson WD, Smith AE (1984). "A short amino acid sequence able to specify nuclear location". Cell. 39 (3): 499–509. doi:10.1016/0092-8674(84)90457-4. .

16.	Lanford RE, Butel JS (1984) Construction and characterization of an SV40 mutant defective in nuclear transport of T antigen. Cell. 1984 37 (3): 801–13. PMID 6086146

17.	Robbins, J., Dilworth, S. M., Laskey, R. A., Dingwall, C. (1991) Two interdependent domains in nucleoplasmin nuclear targeting sequence: identification of a class of bipartite nuclear targeting sequence. Cell 64:615-623.

18.	Dingwall C, Laskey RA (December 1991). "Nuclear targeting sequences--a consensus?". Trends in Biochemical Sciences. 16 (12): 478–81. doi:10.1016/0968-0004(91)90184-W. .

19.	Dingwall, C., Robbins, J. and Dilworth, S.M. (1989) Characterisation of the nuclear location sequence of Xenopus Nucleoplasmin. J.Cell Sci. Suppl 11:243-248. Protein Targeting. The 8th John Innes Symposium. Edited by K F Chater, N. J Brewin, R Casey, K Roberts, T M A, Wilson and R B. Flavell

20.	Conti E, Uy M, Leighton L, Blobel G, Kuriyan J (July 1998). "Crystallographic analysis of the recognition of a nuclear localisation signal by the nuclear import factor karyopherin alpha". Cell. 94 (2): 193–204.

21.	Dingwall, C & Laskey, R. A. (1998) Nuclear import; a tale of two sites. Current Biology. 8; R922-R924 https://doi.org/10.1016/S0960-9822(98)00010-4

22.	Dingwall, C., Ernberg, I., Gait, M. J., Green, S. M., Heaphy, S., Karn, J., Lowe, A. D., Singh, M., Skinner, M. A. (1990) HIV-1 tat protein stimulates transcription by binding to a U-rich bulge in the stem of the TAR RNA structure. EMBO J. 9:4145-53.

23.	Hussain,I., Powell,D.J., Howlett,D.R., Tew,D.G., Meek,T.D., Chapman,C., Gloger, I. S., Murphy, K. E., Southan, C. D., Ryan,D.M.,  Smith, S. S., Simmons,D.L., Walsh,F.S., Dingwall,C., Christie,G. (1999). Identification of a novel aspartic protease (Asp 2) as beta-secretase. Molecular Cellular Neuroscience 14, 419-427

British biochemists
British biologists
Living people
Year of birth missing (living people)